The 1996 Toronto Blue Jays season was the 20th season in franchise history. The season involved the Blue Jays finishing fourth in the American League East with a record of 74 wins and 88 losses. The Blue Jays had a losing record for the third consecutive season.

Offseason
 December 6, 1995: Howard Battle and Ricardo Jordan were traded by the Blue Jays to the Philadelphia Phillies for Paul Quantrill.
 December 7, 1995: Otis Nixon was signed as a free agent by the Toronto Blue Jays.
 December 14, 1995: Charlie O'Brien was signed as a free agent by the Blue Jays.
 December 20, 1995: Mike Huff was signed as a free agent by the Blue Jays.
 January 16, 1996: Juan Samuel was signed as a free agent by the Blue Jays.
 February 10, 1996: Dane Johnson was signed as a free agent by the Blue Jays.
 February 22, 1996: Frank Viola signed as a free agent with the Toronto Blue Jays.

Regular season
A new tradition would start in 1996 as the Blue Jays donned red uniforms for the first time. These uniforms would be worn only on Canada Day and would feature "Canada" on the back of their jerseys rather than a player's name. Eventual Cy Young Award winner Pat Hentgen would start the Canada Day match against the Baltimore Orioles.

The final series of the season would be embroiled in controversy. Against the American League East champion Baltimore Orioles, two events would define the Orioles season. The game on Friday, September 27, 1996, would go down as one of the most infamous events in baseball history, as former Blue Jay Roberto Alomar would spit at umpire John Hirschbeck. The Sunday game would be a coming-out party for Brady Anderson, as he would hit his 50th home run of the regular season off Pat Hentgen. The total would break Frank Robinson's team record for most home runs in a season.

1996 also marked the end of an era for the Blue Jays, as they would redesign their logo and uniforms in the following year and also radically shake up their roster.

Season standings

Record vs. opponents

Game log

|- bgcolor="ccffcc"
| 1 || April 1 || @ Athletics || 9–6 || Hanson (1–0) || Reyes || Timlin (1) || 7,294 || 1–0
|- bgcolor="ccffcc"
| 2 || April 3 || @ Athletics || 10–4 || Hentgen (1–0) || Prieto || — || 8,050 || 2–0
|- bgcolor="ccffcc"
| 3 || April 5 || @ Indians || 7–1 || Guzman (1–0) || Hershiser || — || 41,782 || 3–0
|- bgcolor="ffbbbb"
| 4 || April 6 || @ Indians || 3–5 || Nagy || Hanson (1–1) || Mesa || 41,852 || 3–1
|- bgcolor="ffbbbb"
| 5 || April 7 || @ Indians || 3–8 || Martinez || Quantrill (0–1) || — || 41,689 || 3–2
|- bgcolor="ccffcc"
| 6 || April 9 || Angels || 5–0 || Hentgen (2–0) || Langston || — || 36,616 || 4–2
|- bgcolor="ffbbbb"
| 7 || April 10 || Angels || 1–2 || Holzemer || Guzman (1–1) || Percival || 25,446 || 4–3
|- bgcolor="ccffcc"
| 8 || April 11 || Angels || 7–4 || Hanson (2–1) || Abbott || Timlin (2) || 25,512 || 5–3
|- bgcolor="ffbbbb"
| 9 || April 12 || Mariners || 6–9 || Hitchcock || Quantrill (0–2) || — || 31,293 || 5–4
|- bgcolor="ffbbbb"
| 10 || April 13 || Mariners || 3–14 || Bosio || Ware (0–1) || — || 33,645 || 5–5
|- bgcolor="ffbbbb"
| 11 || April 14 || Mariners || 4–9 || Wolcott || Hentgen (2–1) || — || 29,301 || 5–6
|- bgcolor="ccffcc"
| 12 || April 15 || Tigers || 8–2 || Guzman (2–1) || Olivares || — || 26,127 || 6–6
|- bgcolor="ffbbbb"
| 13 || April 16 || Tigers || 8–13 || Gohr || Hanson (2–2) || Lewis || 25,503 || 6–7
|- bgcolor="ffbbbb"
| 14 || April 17 || @ Angels || 1–5 || Finley || Quantrill (0–3) || — || 15,361 || 6–8
|- bgcolor="ffbbbb"
| 15 || April 18 || @ Angels || 6–9 || James || Ware (0–2) || Percival || 25,083 || 6–9
|- bgcolor="ccffcc"
| 16 || April 19 || @ Mariners || 10–4 || Hentgen (3–1) || Wolcott || Bohanon (1) || 32,189 || 7–9
|- bgcolor="ccffcc"
| 17 || April 20 || @ Mariners || 3–1 || Guzman (3–1) || Menhart || Timlin (3) || 47,487 || 8–9
|- bgcolor="ffbbbb"
| 18 || April 21 || @ Mariners || 5–9 || Johnson || Hanson (2–3) || — || 34,915 || 8–10
|- bgcolor="ccffcc"
| 19 || April 22 || @ Mariners || 16–7 || Castillo (1–0) || Hurtado || — || 18,467 || 9–10
|- bgcolor="ffbbbb"
| 20 || April 24 || Athletics || 6–7 || Prieto || Hentgen (3–2) || Corsi || 28,029 || 9–11
|- bgcolor="ffbbbb"
| 21 || April 25 || Athletics || 3–4 (11) || Mohler || Crabtree (0–1) || — || 26,163 || 9–12
|- bgcolor="ffbbbb"
| 22 || April 26 || Indians || 3–6 || Hershiser || Hanson (2–4) || Mesa || 30,227 || 9–13
|- bgcolor="ccffcc"
| 23 || April 27 || Indians || 11–6 || Castillo (2–0) || Nagy || — || 40,140 || 10–13
|- bgcolor="ffbbbb"
| 24 || April 28 || Indians || 3–17 || Lopez || Viola (0–1) || — || 31,143 || 10–14
|- bgcolor="ccffcc"
| 25 || April 30 || Brewers || 9–8 || Crabtree (1–1) || Boze || — || 25,467 || 11–14
|-

|- bgcolor="ccffcc"
| 26 || May 1 || Brewers || 9–3 || Guzman (4–1) || Miranda || — || 25,684 || 12–14
|- bgcolor="ccffcc"
| 27 || May 2 || Brewers || 7–5 || Hanson (3–4) || Karl || Timlin (4) || 31,299 || 13–14
|- bgcolor="ffbbbb"
| 28 || May 3 || @ Red Sox || 7–8 || Moyer || Quantrill (0–4) || Slocumb || 25,570 || 13–15
|- bgcolor="ffbbbb"
| 29 || May 4 || @ Red Sox || 4–8 || Gordon || Viola (0–2) || Slocumb || 29,785 || 13–16
|- bgcolor="ccffcc"
| 30 || May 5 || @ Red Sox || 11–4 || Hentgen (4–2) || Wakefield || — || 29,866 || 14–16
|- bgcolor="ffbbbb"
| 31 || May 7 || @ Rangers || 1–5 || Oliver || Guzman (4–2) || — || 23,005 || 14–17
|- bgcolor="ffbbbb"
| 32 || May 8 || @ Rangers || 2–4 || Witt || Hanson (3–5) || Henneman || 20,694 || 14–18
|- bgcolor="ccffcc"
| 33 || May 9 || @ Rangers || 5–2 || Quantrill (1–4) || Hill || Timlin (5) || 34,451 || 15–18
|- bgcolor="ffbbbb"
| 34 || May 10 || Red Sox || 5–6 (11) || Slocumb || Carrara (0–1) || — || 31,159 || 15–19
|- bgcolor="ccffcc"
| 35 || May 11 || Red Sox || 9–8 (11) || Quantrill (2–4) || Knackert || — || 33,163 || 16–19
|- bgcolor="ccffcc"
| 36 || May 12 || Red Sox || 8–7 (10) || Janzen (1–0) || Slocumb || — || 31,188 || 17–19
|- bgcolor="ccffcc"
| 37 || May 14 || @ Twins || 4–2 || Hanson (4–5) || Robertson || Timlin (6) || 13,483 || 18–19
|- bgcolor="ffbbbb"
| 38 || May 15 || @ Twins || 1–2 || Rodriguez || Hentgen (4–3) || — || 11,793 || 18–20
|- bgcolor="ffbbbb"
| 39 || May 16 || @ Twins || 1–4 || Radke || Quantrill (2–5) || Stevens || 13,538 || 18–21
|- bgcolor="ffbbbb"
| 40 || May 17 || @ Royals || 2–4 || Belcher || Guzman (4–3) || Montgomery || 20,079 || 18–22
|- bgcolor="ccffcc"
| 41 || May 18 || @ Royals || 6–2 || Viola (1–2) || Appier || — || 18,116 || 19–22
|- bgcolor="ccffcc"
| 42 || May 19 || @ Royals || 3–2 || Hanson (5–5) || Gubicza || Timlin (7) || 15,039 || 20–22
|- bgcolor="ffbbbb"
| 43 || May 20 || @ Royals || 4–5 || Haney || Hentgen (4–4) || Montgomery || 14,303 || 20–23
|- bgcolor="ffbbbb"
| 44 || May 21 || @ White Sox || 1–2 || Tapani || Ware (0–3) || Hernandez || 17,483 || 20–24
|- bgcolor="ffbbbb"
| 45 || May 22 || @ White Sox || 1–2 (11) || McCaskill || Timlin (0–1) || — || 17,882 || 20–25
|- bgcolor="ccffcc"
| 46 || May 23 || Twins || 5–4 (10) || Janzen (2–0) || Milchin || — || 31,163 || 21–25
|- bgcolor="ffbbbb"
| 47 || May 24 || Twins || 0–4 || Robertson || Hanson (5–6) || — || 33,141 || 21–26
|- bgcolor="ffbbbb"
| 48 || May 25 || Twins || 4–6 (10) || Guardado || Castillo (2–1) || Stevens || 34,118 || 21–27
|- bgcolor="ffbbbb"
| 49 || May 26 || Twins || 3–9 || Naulty || Bohanon (0–1) || — || 30,170 || 21–28
|- bgcolor="ccffcc"
| 50 || May 27 || White Sox || 5–4 || Janzen (3–0) || Fernandez || Timlin (8) || 30,013 || 22–28
|- bgcolor="ffbbbb"
| 51 || May 28 || White Sox || 5–8 || Baldwin || Viola (1–3) || Hernandez || 30,104 || 22–29
|- bgcolor="ccffcc"
| 52 || May 29 || White Sox || 6–5 || Hanson (6–6) || Magrane || Timlin (9) || 31,074 || 23–29
|- bgcolor="ccffcc"
| 53 || May 31 || Royals || 4–2 || Hentgen (5–4) || Gubicza || Timlin (10) || 33,194 || 24–29
|-

|- bgcolor="ccffcc"
| 54 || June 1 || Royals || 5–3 (10) || Crabtree (2–1) || Montgomery || — || 31,107 || 25–29
|- bgcolor="ffbbbb"
| 55 || June 2 || Royals || 5–7 || Belcher || Janzen (3–1) || Montgomery || 32,253 || 25–30
|- bgcolor="ffbbbb"
| 56 || June 4 || @ Yankees || 4–5 || Gooden || Hanson (6–7) || Wetteland || 17,368 || 25–31
|- bgcolor="ccffcc"
| 57 || June 5 || @ Yankees || 12–7 || Hentgen (6–4) || Key || — || 17,142 || 26–31
|- bgcolor="ffbbbb"
| 58 || June 6 || @ Yankees || 1–8 || Pettitte || Quantrill (2–6) || — || 18,475 || 26–32
|- bgcolor="ffbbbb"
| 59 || June 7 || @ Rangers || 7–10 || Pavlik || Janzen (3–2) || Henneman || 40,046 || 26–33
|- bgcolor="ffbbbb"
| 60 || June 8 || @ Rangers || 0–2 || Oliver || Guzman (4–4) || — || 43,439 || 26–34
|- bgcolor="ffbbbb"
| 61 || June 9 || @ Rangers || 6–8 || Witt || Hanson (6–8) || Henneman || 41,605 || 26–35
|- bgcolor="ffbbbb"
| 62 || June 10 || Yankees || 3–5 || Key || Hentgen (6–5) || Wetteland || 37,332 || 26–36
|- bgcolor="ffbbbb"
| 63 || June 11 || Yankees || 4–6 || Pettitte || Quantrill (2–7) || Wetteland || 32,114 || 26–37
|- bgcolor="ccffcc"
| 64 || June 12 || Yankees || 7–4 || Janzen (4–2) || Mendoza || — || 44,238 || 27–37
|- bgcolor="ffbbbb"
| 65 || June 13 || @ Angels || 4–6 || Finley || Guzman (4–5) || James || 20,528 || 27–38
|- bgcolor="ffbbbb"
| 66 || June 14 || @ Angels || 4–7 || Grimsley || Hanson (6–9) || Percival || 18,503 || 27–39
|- bgcolor="ffbbbb"
| 67 || June 15 || @ Angels || 5–7 || Langston || Crabtree (2–2) || Percival || 40,352 || 27–40
|- bgcolor="ccffcc"
| 68 || June 16 || @ Angels || 6–4 || Quantrill (3–7) || Abbott || Timlin (11) || 22,979 || 28–40
|- bgcolor="ccffcc"
| 69 || June 18 || @ Mariners || 11–3 || Guzman (5–5) || Wolcott || — || 25,912 || 29–40
|- bgcolor="ccffcc"
| 70 || June 19 || @ Mariners || 9–2 || Hanson (7–9) || Harikkala || — || 26,265 || 30–40
|- bgcolor="ccffcc"
| 71 || June 20 || @ Athletics || 1–0 || Hentgen (7–5) || Wengert || Timlin (12) || 8,027 || 31–40
|- bgcolor="ccffcc"
| 72 || June 21 || @ Athletics || 7–5 || Quantrill (4–7) || Johns || Timlin (13) || 10,278 || 32–40
|- bgcolor="ffbbbb"
| 73 || June 22 || @ Athletics || 4–8 || Chouinard || Ware (0–4) || — || 20,124 || 32–41
|- bgcolor="ccffcc"
| 74 || June 23 || @ Athletics || 5–4 || Guzman (6–5) || Wojciechowski || Timlin (14) || 14,407 || 33–41
|- bgcolor="ccffcc"
| 75 || June 25 || Mariners || 8–7 || Crabtree (3–2) || Charlton || — || 31,420 || 34–41
|- bgcolor="ccffcc"
| 76 || June 26 || Mariners || 6–5 || Ware (1–4) || Ayala || Crabtree (1) || 30,158 || 35–41
|- bgcolor="ffbbbb"
| 77 || June 27 || Mariners || 1–9 || Wells || Quantrill (4–8) || — || 31,108 || 35–42
|- bgcolor="ffbbbb"
| 78 || June 28 || Brewers || 1–5 || D'Amico || Guzman (6–6) || Fetters || 31,333 || 35–43
|- bgcolor="ffbbbb"
| 79 || June 29 || Brewers || 4–7 || Karl || Janzen (4–3) || — || 31,170 || 35–44
|- bgcolor="ccffcc"
| 80 || June 30 || Brewers || 15–2 || Hanson (8–9) || Bones || — || 30,104 || 36–44
|-

|- bgcolor="ffbbbb"
| 81 || July 1 || Orioles || 4–7 || Coppinger || Hentgen (7–6) || Myers || 43,377 || 36–45
|- bgcolor="ffbbbb"
| 82 || July 2 || Orioles || 2–8 || Erickson || Quantrill (4–9) || — || 32,150 || 36–46
|- bgcolor="ccffcc"
| 83 || July 3 || Orioles || 5–2 || Guzman (7–6) || Krivda || Timlin (15) || 32,365 || 37–46
|- bgcolor="ffbbbb"
| 84 || July 4 || @ Tigers || 1–6 || Nitkowski || Janzen (4–4) || Myers || 10,557 || 37–47
|- bgcolor="ffbbbb"
| 85 || July 5 || @ Tigers || 3–4 || Sager || Hanson (8–10) || Olson || 20,808 || 37–48
|- bgcolor="ccffcc"
| 86 || July 6 || @ Tigers || 15–0 || Hentgen (8–6) || Olivares || — || 16,228 || 38–48
|- bgcolor="ffbbbb"
| 87 || July 7 || @ Tigers || 0–9 || Lira || Ware (1–5) || — || 15,784 || 38–49
|- bgcolor="ccffcc"
| 88 || July 11 || @ Brewers || 6–3 || Guzman (8–6) || D'Amico || Castillo (1) || 16,019 || 39–49
|- bgcolor="ffbbbb"
| 89 || July 12 || @ Brewers || 5–12 || McDonald || Hanson (8–11) || — || 15,691 || 39–50
|- bgcolor="ccffcc"
| 90 || July 13 || @ Brewers || 15–7 || Hentgen (9–6) || Karl || — || 29,383 || 40–50
|- bgcolor="ccffcc"
| 91 || July 14 || @ Brewers || 7–5 (10) || Crabtree (4–2) || Garcia || Timlin (16) || 20,798 || 41–50
|- bgcolor="ffbbbb"
| 92 || July 15 || @ Orioles || 6–8 || Haynes || Timlin (0–2) || — || 43,192 || 41–51
|- bgcolor="ccffcc"
| 93 || July 16 || @ Orioles || 6–0 || Guzman (9–6) || Mussina || — || 45,851 || 42–51
|- bgcolor="ffbbbb"
| 94 || July 17 || @ Orioles || 10–11 || Coppinger || Timlin (0–3) || — || 45,955 || 42–52
|- bgcolor="ccffcc"
| 95 || July 18 || Tigers || 8–4 || Hentgen (10–6) || Nitkowski || — || 31,202 || 43–52
|- bgcolor="ffbbbb"
| 96 || July 19 || Tigers || 6–8 || Urbani || Janzen (4–5) || Olson || 30,123 || 43–53
|- bgcolor="ffbbbb"
| 97 || July 20 || Tigers || 4–5 (10) || Olson || Quantrill (4–10) || Lima || 36,220 || 43–54
|- bgcolor="ccffcc"
| 98 || July 21 || Tigers || 5–4 (12) || Spoljaric (1–0) || Lima || — || 33,238 || 44–54
|- bgcolor="ffbbbb"
| 99 || July 22 || Indians || 2–4 || Hershiser || Hanson (8–12) || Mesa || 35,517 || 44–55
|- bgcolor="ccffcc"
| 100 || July 23 || Indians || 3–1 || Hentgen (11–6) || Ogea || Timlin (17) || 35,194 || 45–55
|- bgcolor="ffbbbb"
| 101 || July 24 || Indians || 0–10 || Martinez || Janzen (4–6) || — || 35,218 || 45–56
|- bgcolor="ccffcc"
| 102 || July 25 || Athletics || 4–3 || Crabtree (5–2) || Witasick || — || 30,174 || 46–56
|- bgcolor="ffbbbb"
| 103 || July 26 || Athletics || 3–5 || Groom || Castillo (2–2) || Taylor || 32,241 || 46–57
|- bgcolor="ccffcc"
| 104 || July 27 || Athletics || 6–4 || Hanson (9–12) || Wasdin || Timlin (18) || 32,162 || 47–57
|- bgcolor="ccffcc"
| 105 || July 28 || Athletics || 1–0 || Hentgen (12–6) || Prieto || — || 31,150 || 48–57
|- bgcolor="ccffcc"
| 106 || July 30 || @ Indians || 3–1 || Flener (1–0) || Martinez || Timlin (19) || 42,355 || 49–57
|- bgcolor="ffbbbb"
| 107 || July 31 || @ Indians || 2–4 || Assenmacher || Timlin (0–4) || — || 42,301 || 49–58
|-

|- bgcolor="ccffcc"
| 108 || August 1 || @ Indians || 5–3 || Hanson (10–12) || Lopez || Timlin (20) || 42,249 || 50–58
|- bgcolor="ccffcc"
| 109 || August 2 || Angels || 9–2 || Hentgen (13–6) || Finley || — || 30,261 || 51–58
|- bgcolor="ffbbbb"
| 110 || August 3 || Angels || 6–11 || Langston || Castillo (2–3) || — || 32,139 || 51–59
|- bgcolor="ccffcc"
| 111 || August 4 || Angels || 7–1 || Flener (2–0) || Abbott || — || 30,253 || 52–59
|- bgcolor="ffbbbb"
| 112 || August 5 || @ Red Sox || 1–3 || Wakefield || Guzman (9–7) || — || 23,884 || 52–60
|- bgcolor="ffbbbb"
| 113 || August 6 || @ Red Sox || 2–3 || Maddux || Hanson (10–13) || Slocumb || 25,264 || 52–61
|- bgcolor="ffbbbb"
| 114 || August 7 || @ Red Sox || 0–8 || Gordon || Hentgen (13–7) || — || 30,443 || 52–62
|- bgcolor="ccffcc"
| 115 || August 8 || @ Red Sox || 9–6 || Williams (1–0) || Sele || Timlin (21) || 32,696 || 53–62
|- bgcolor="ffbbbb"
| 116 || August 9 || Rangers || 4–5 || Witt || Quantrill (4–11) || Henneman || 33,535 || 53–63
|- bgcolor="ffbbbb"
| 117 || August 10 || Rangers || 1–12 || Oliver || Guzman (9–8) || — || 34,109 || 53–64
|- bgcolor="ffbbbb"
| 118 || August 11 || Rangers || 0–6 || Burkett || Hanson (10–14) || — || 32,162 || 53–65
|- bgcolor="ccffcc"
| 119 || August 12 || Red Sox || 5–1 || Hentgen (14–7) || Gordon || — || 33,250 || 54–65
|- bgcolor="ffbbbb"
| 120 || August 13 || Red Sox || 5–7 || Brandenburg || Williams (1–1) || Slocumb || 30,502 || 54–66
|- bgcolor="ffbbbb"
| 121 || August 14 || Red Sox || 6–8 || Belinda || Crabtree (5–3) || Slocumb || 32,354 || 54–67
|- bgcolor="ffbbbb"
| 122 || August 16 || @ Twins || 4–5 (10) || Parra || Quantrill (4–12) || — || 19,838 || 54–68
|- bgcolor="ffbbbb"
| 123 || August 17 || @ Twins || 1–11 || Robertson || Hanson (10–15) || — || 20,354 || 54–69
|- bgcolor="ccffcc"
| 124 || August 18 || @ Twins || 6–2 || Hentgen (15–7) || Aguilera || — || 18,010 || 55–69
|- bgcolor="ccffcc"
| 125 || August 19 || @ Royals || 2–1 || Spoljaric (2–0) || Rosado || Timlin (22) || 16,862 || 56–69
|- bgcolor="ccffcc"
| 126 || August 20 || @ Royals || 6–5 (14) || Timlin (1–4) || Huisman || — || 14,568 || 57–69
|- bgcolor="ccffcc"
| 127 || August 21 || @ Royals || 6–2 || Guzman (10–8) || Haney || — || 12,238 || 58–69
|- bgcolor="ccffcc"
| 128 || August 22 || @ White Sox || 1–0 (6) || Hanson (11–15) || Fernandez || — || 22,394 || 59–69
|- bgcolor="ccffcc"
| 129 || August 23 || @ White Sox || 4–2 || Hentgen (16–7) || Ruffcorn || — || 19,132 || 60–69
|- bgcolor="ccffcc"
| 130 || August 24 || @ White Sox || 9–2 || Williams (2–1) || Baldwin || — || 29,413 || 61–69
|- bgcolor="ffbbbb"
| 131 || August 25 || @ White Sox || 9–10 (10) || Hernandez || Timlin (1–5) || — || 19,647 || 61–70
|- bgcolor="ccffcc"
| 132 || August 26 || Twins || 5–3 || Guzman (11–8) || Radke || Timlin (23) || 31,134 || 62–70
|- bgcolor="ffbbbb"
| 133 || August 27 || Twins || 4–6 (11) || Trombley || Quantrill (4–13) || — || 30,033 || 62–71
|- bgcolor="ccffcc"
| 134 || August 28 || Twins || 6–1 || Hentgen (17–7) || Aguilera || — || 30,106 || 63–71
|- bgcolor="ffbbbb"
| 135 || August 30 || White Sox || 2–11 || Tapani || Williams (2–2) || — || 30,072 || 63–72
|- bgcolor="ffbbbb"
| 136 || August 31 || White Sox || 1–5 || Alvarez || Flener (2–1) || — || 32,141 || 63–73
|-

|- bgcolor="ffbbbb"
| 137 || September 1 || White Sox || 2–4 (11) || Hernandez || Spoljaric (2–1) || — || 30,156 || 63–74
|- bgcolor="ffbbbb"
| 138 || September 2 || Royals || 0–2 || Belcher || Hanson (11–16) || — || 28,177 || 63–75
|- bgcolor="ffbbbb"
| 139 || September 3 || Royals || 2–5 || Appier || Hentgen (17–8) || — || 25,729 || 63–76
|- bgcolor="ccffcc"
| 140 || September 4 || Royals || 6–0 || Williams (3–2) || Rosado || — || 25,827 || 64–76
|- bgcolor="ffbbbb"
| 141 || September 6 || @ Yankees || 3–4 || Rivera || Risley (0–1) || — || 21,528 || 64–77
|- bgcolor="ccffcc"
| 142 || September 7 || @ Yankees || 3–2 || Quantrill (5–13) || Cone || Timlin (24) || 27,069 || 65–77
|- bgcolor="ccffcc"
| 143 || September 8 || @ Yankees || 4–2 || Hanson (12–16) || Pettitte || Timlin (25) || 28,575 || 66–77
|- bgcolor="ffbbbb"
| 144 || September 9 || Rangers || 3–4 || Gross || Hentgen (17–9) || Henneman || 25,825 || 66–78
|- bgcolor="ffbbbb"
| 145 || September 10 || Rangers || 8–11 || Oliver || Williams (3–3) || Henneman || 26,286 || 66–79
|- bgcolor="ccffcc"
| 146 || September 11 || Rangers || 8–3 || Andujar (1–0) || Vosberg || — || 27,262 || 67–79
|- bgcolor="ffbbbb"
| 147 || September 13 || Yankees || 1–4 || Pettitte || Hanson (12–17) || Wetteland || 31,227 || 67–80
|- bgcolor="ffbbbb"
| 148 || September 14 || Yankees || 1–3 || Boehringer || Hentgen (17–10) || Wetteland || 43,397 || 67–81
|- bgcolor="ccffcc"
| 149 || September 15 || Yankees || 3–1 || Williams (4–3) || Mendoza || Timlin (26) || 36,268 || 68–81
|- bgcolor="ffbbbb"
| 150 || September 16 || Yankees || 0–10 || Key || Quantrill (5–14) || — || 30,115 || 68–82
|- bgcolor="ffbbbb"
| 151 || September 17 || @ Brewers || 0–4 || McDonald || Andujar (1–1) || — || 10,184 || 68–83
|- bgcolor="ffbbbb"
| 152 || September 18 || @ Brewers || 1–2 || Fetters || Timlin (1–6) || — || 9,550 || 68–84
|- bgcolor="ccffcc"
| 153 || September 20 || @ Orioles || 5–1 || Hentgen (18–10) || Krivda || Spoljaric (1) || 47,026 || 69–84
|- bgcolor="ffbbbb"
| 154 || September 21 || @ Orioles || 3–6 || Coppinger || Williams (4–4) || Myers || 47,270 || 69–85
|- bgcolor="ffbbbb"
| 155 || September 22 || @ Orioles || 4–5 || Erickson || Flener (2–2) || Benitez || 46,035 || 69–86
|- bgcolor="ccffcc"
| 156 || September 23 || @ Tigers || 6–4 || Hanson (13–17) || Sager || Timlin (27) || 9,678 || 70–86
|- bgcolor="ccffcc"
| 157 || September 24 || @ Tigers || 4–1 || Hentgen (19–10) || Miller || Timlin (28) || 8,355 || 71–86
|- bgcolor="ccffcc"
| 158 || September 25 || @ Tigers || 13–11 || Brow (1–0) || Cummings || Timlin (29) || 8,055 || 72–86
|- bgcolor="ffbbbb"
| 159 || September 26 || Orioles || 1–4 || Coppinger || Williams (4–5) || Benitez || 30,141 || 72–87
|- bgcolor="ccffcc"
| 160 || September 27 || Orioles || 3–2 || Flener (3–2) || Erickson || Timlin (30) || 30,116 || 73–87
|- bgcolor="ffbbbb"
| 161 || September 28 || Orioles || 2–3 (10) || Myers || Spoljaric (2–2) || — || 36,316 || 73–88
|- bgcolor="ccffcc"
| 162 || September 29 || Orioles || 4–1 || Hentgen (20–10) || Rodriguez || Timlin (31) || 38,267 || 74–88
|-

|-
| Legend:       = Win       = LossBold = Blue Jays team member

Detailed records

Opening Day starters
Tilson Brito
Joe Carter
Alex Gonzalez
Pat Hentgen
Otis Nixon
Charlie O'Brien
John Olerud
Robert Pérez
Juan Samuel
Ed Sprague

Notable transactions
 May 15, 1996: D. J. Boston (minors) was traded by the Blue Jays to the Pittsburgh Pirates for Jacob Brumfield.
 June 4, 1996: 1996 Major League Baseball draft
Billy Koch was drafted by the Blue Jays in the 1st round (4th pick). Player signed August 23, 1996.
Joe Lawrence was drafted by the Blue Jays in the 1st round (16th pick). Player signed July 1, 1996.
Orlando Hudson was drafted by the Toronto Blue Jays in the 33rd round, but did not sign.
 June 5, 1996: Frank Viola was released by the Toronto Blue Jays.
 June 15, 1996: Luis Lopez was signed as an amateur free agent by the Blue Jays.

Roster

Game log

|- align="center" bgcolor="bbffbb"
| 1 || April 1 || @ Athletics † || 9 – 6 || Hanson (1-0) || Reyes (0-1) || Timlin (1) || 7,294 || 1-0
|- align="center" bgcolor="bbffbb"
| 2 || April 3 || @ Athletics † || 10 – 4 || Hentgen (1-0) || Prieto (0-1) || || 8,050 || 2-0
|- align="center" bgcolor="bbffbb"
| 3 || April 5 || @ Indians || 7 – 1 || Guzmán (1-0) || Hershiser (0-1) || || 41,782 || 3-0
|- align="center" bgcolor="ffbbbb"
| 4 || April 6 || @ Indians || 5 – 3 || Nagy (1-0) || Hanson (1-1) || Mesa (1) || 41,852 || 3-1
|- align="center" bgcolor="ffbbbb"
| 5 || April 7 || @ Indians || 8 – 3 || Martínez (1-1) || Quantrill (0-1) || || 41,689 || 3-2
|- align="center" bgcolor="bbffbb"
| 6 || April 9 || Angels || 5 – 0 || Hentgen (2-0) || Langston (0-1) || || 36,616 || 4-2
|- align="center" bgcolor="ffbbbb"
| 7 || April 10 || Angels || 2 – 1 || Holzemer (1-0) || Guzmán (1-1) || Percival (2) || 25,446 || 4-3
|- align="center" bgcolor="bbffbb"
| 8 || April 11 || Angels || 7 – 4 || Hanson (2-1) || Abbott (0-2) || Timlin (2) || 25,512 || 5-3
|- align="center" bgcolor="ffbbbb"
| 9 || April 12 || Mariners || 9 – 6 || Hitchcock (3-0) || Quantrill (0-2) || || 31,293 || 5-4
|- align="center" bgcolor="ffbbbb"
| 10 || April 13 || Mariners || 14 – 3 || Bosio (1-0) || Ware (0-1) || || 33,645 || 5-5
|- align="center" bgcolor="ffbbbb"
| 11 || April 14 || Mariners || 9 – 4 || Wolcott (1-1) || Hentgen (2-1) || || 29,301 || 5-6
|- align="center" bgcolor="bbffbb"
| 12 || April 15 || Tigers || 8 – 2 || Guzmán (2-1) || Olivares (1-1) || || 26,127 || 6-6
|- align="center" bgcolor="ffbbbb"
| 13 || April 16 || Tigers || 13 – 8 || Gohr (1-2) || Hanson (2-2) || Lewis (1) || 25,503 || 6-7
|- align="center" bgcolor="ffbbbb"
| 14 || April 17 || @ Angels || 5 – 1 || Finley (3-1) || Quantrill (0-3) || || 15,361 || 6-8
|- align="center" bgcolor="ffbbbb"
| 15 || April 18 || @ Angels || 9 – 6 || James (3-1) || Ware (0-2) || Percival (4) || 25,083 || 6-9
|- align="center" bgcolor="bbffbb"
| 16 || April 19 || @ Mariners || 10 – 4 || Hentgen (3-1) || Wolcott (1-2) || Bohanon (1) || 32,189 || 7-9
|- align="center" bgcolor="bbffbb"
| 17 || April 20 || @ Mariners || 3 – 1 || Guzmán (3-1) || Menhart (0-2) || Timlin (3) || 47,487 || 8-9
|- align="center" bgcolor="ffbbbb"
| 18 || April 21 || @ Mariners || 9 – 5 || Johnson (4-0) || Hanson (2-3) || || 34,915 || 8-10
|- align="center" bgcolor="bbffbb"
| 19 || April 22 || @ Mariners || 16 – 7 || Castillo (1-0) || Hurtado (1-3) || || 18,467 || 9-10
|- align="center" bgcolor="ffbbbb"
| 20 || April 24 || Athletics || 7 – 6 || Prieto (1-1) || Hentgen (3-2) || Corsi (1) || 28,029 || 9-11
|- align="center" bgcolor="ffbbbb"
| 21 || April 25 || Athletics || 4 – 3 (11) || Mohler (2-0) || Crabtree (0-1) || || 26,163 || 9-12
|- align="center" bgcolor="ffbbbb"
| 22 || April 26 || Indians || 6 – 3 || Hershiser (2-2) || Hanson (2-4) || Mesa (8) || 30,227 || 9-13
|- align="center" bgcolor="bbffbb"
| 23 || April 27 || Indians || 11 – 6 || Castillo (2-0) || Nagy (3-1) || || 40,140 || 10-13
|- align="center" bgcolor="ffbbbb"
| 24 || April 28 || Indians || 17 – 3 || Lopez (1-0) || Viola (0-1) || || 31,143 || 10-14
|- align="center" bgcolor="bbffbb"
| 25 || April 30 || Brewers || 9 – 8 || Crabtree (1-1) || Boze (0-1) || || 25,467 || 11-14
|-

|- align="center" bgcolor="bbffbb"
| 26 || May 1 || Brewers || 9 – 3 || Guzmán (4-1) || Miranda (1-1) || || 25,684 || 12-14
|- align="center" bgcolor="bbffbb"
| 27 || May 2 || Brewers || 7 – 5 || Hanson (3-4) || Karl (2-2) || Timlin (4) || 31,299 || 13-14
|- align="center" bgcolor="ffbbbb"
| 28 || May 3 || @ Red Sox || 8 – 7 ‡ || Moyer (3-1) || Quantrill (0-4) || Slocumb (5) || 25,570 || 13-15
|- align="center" bgcolor="ffbbbb"
| 29 || May 4 || @ Red Sox || 8 – 4 || Gordon (2-2) || Viola (0-2) || Slocumb (6) || 29,785 || 13-16
|- align="center" bgcolor="bbffbb"
| 30 || May 5 || @ Red Sox || 11 – 4 || Hentgen (4-2) || Wakefield (2-4) || || 29,866 || 14-16
|- align="center" bgcolor="ffbbbb"
| 31 || May 7 || @ Rangers || 5 – 1 || Oliver (2-0) || Guzmán (4-2) || || 23,005 || 14-17
|- align="center" bgcolor="ffbbbb"
| 32 || May 8 || @ Rangers || 4 – 2 || Witt (4-2) || Hanson (3-5) || Henneman (8) || 20,694 || 14-18
|- align="center" bgcolor="bbffbb"
| 33 || May 9 || @ Rangers || 5 – 2 || Quantrill (1-4) || Hill (4-3) || Timlin (5) || 34,451 || 15-18
|- align="center" bgcolor="ffbbbb"
| 34 || May 10 || Red Sox || 6 – 5 (11)|| Slocumb (1-1) || Carrara (0-1) || || 31,159 || 15-19
|- align="center" bgcolor="bbffbb"
| 35 || May 11 || Red Sox || 9 – 8 (11)|| Quantrill (2-4) || Knackert (0-1) || || 33,163 || 16-19
|- align="center" bgcolor="bbffbb"
| 36 || May 12 || Red Sox || 8 – 7 (10)|| Janzen (1-0) || Slocumb (1-2) || || 31,188 || 17-19
|- align="center" bgcolor="bbffbb"
| 37 || May 14 || @ Twins || 4 – 2 || Hanson (4-5) || Robertson (0-6) || Timlin (6) || 13,483 || 18-19
|- align="center" bgcolor="ffbbbb"
| 38 || May 15 || @ Twins || 2 – 1 || Rodriguez (3-4) || Hentgen (4-3) || || 11,793 || 18-20
|- align="center" bgcolor="ffbbbb"
| 39 || May 16 || @ Twins || 4 – 1 || Radke (4-5) || Quantrill (2-5) || Stevens (8) || 13,538 || 18-21
|- align="center" bgcolor="ffbbbb"
| 40 || May 17 || @ Royals || 4 – 2 || Belcher (4-2) || Guzmán (4-3) || Montgomery (10) || 20,079 || 18-22
|- align="center" bgcolor="bbffbb"
| 41 || May 18 || @ Royals || 6 – 2 || Viola (1-2) || Appier (3-4) || || 18,116 || 19-22
|- align="center" bgcolor="bbffbb"
| 42 || May 19 || @ Royals || 3 – 2 || Hanson (5-5) || Gubicza (3-6) || Timlin (7) || 15,039 || 20-22
|- align="center" bgcolor="ffbbbb"
| 43 || May 20 || @ Royals || 5 – 4 || Haney (3-4) || Hentgen (4-4) || Montgomery (11) || 14,303 || 20-23
|- align="center" bgcolor="ffbbbb"
| 44 || May 21 || @ White Sox || 2 – 1 || Tapani (4-3) || Ware (0-3) || Hernández (12) || 17,483 || 20-24
|- align="center" bgcolor="ffbbbb"
| 45 || May 22 || @ White Sox || 2 – 1 (11)|| McCaskill (3-2) || Timlin (0-1) || || 17,882 || 20-25
|- align="center" bgcolor="bbffbb"
| 46 || May 23 || Twins || 5 – 4 (10)|| Janzen (2-0) || Milchin (1-1) || || 31,163 || 21-25
|- align="center" bgcolor="ffbbbb"
| 47 || May 24 || Twins || 4 – 0 || Robertson (1-7) || Hanson (5-6) || || 33,141 || 21-26
|- align="center" bgcolor="ffbbbb"
| 48 || May 25 || Twins || 6 – 4 (10)|| Guardado (2-2) || Castillo (2-1) || Stevens (9) || 34,118 || 21-27
|- align="center" bgcolor="ffbbbb"
| 49 || May 26 || Twins || 9 – 3 || Naulty (3-0) || Bohanon (0-1) || || 30,170 || 21-28
|- align="center" bgcolor="bbffbb"
| 50 || May 27 || White Sox || 5 – 4 || Janzen (3-0) || Fernandez (5-3) || Timlin (8) || 30,013 || 22-28
|- align="center" bgcolor="ffbbbb"
| 51 || May 28 || White Sox || 8 – 5 || Baldwin (4-1) || Viola (1-3) || Hernández (15) || 30,104 || 22-29
|- align="center" bgcolor="bbffbb"
| 52 || May 29 || White Sox || 6 – 5 || Hanson (6-6) || Magrane (1-1) || Timlin (9) || 31,074 || 23-29
|- align="center" bgcolor="bbffbb"
| 53 || May 31 || Royals || 4 – 2 || Hentgen (5-4) || Gubicza (4-7) || Timlin (10) || 33,194 || 24-29
|-

|- align="center" bgcolor="bbffbb"
| 54 || June 1 || Royals || 5 – 3 (10)|| Crabtree (2-1) || Montgomery (1-3) || || 31,107 || 25-29
|- align="center" bgcolor="ffbbbb"
| 55 || June 2 || Royals || 7 – 5 || Belcher (6-2) || Janzen (3-1) || Montgomery (14) || 32,253 || 25-30
|- align="center" bgcolor="ffbbbb"
| 56 || June 4 || @ Yankees || 5 – 4 || Gooden (4-4) || Hanson (6-7) || Wetteland (13) || 17,368 || 25-31
|- align="center" bgcolor="bbffbb"
| 57 || June 5 || @ Yankees || 12 – 7 || Hentgen (6-4) || Key (2-6) || || 17,142 || 26-31
|- align="center" bgcolor="ffbbbb"
| 58 || June 6 || @ Yankees || 8 – 1 || Pettitte (9-3) || Quantrill (2-6) || || 18,475 || 26-32
|- align="center" bgcolor="ffbbbb"
| 59 || June 7 || @ Rangers || 10 – 7 || Pavlik (8-1) || Janzen (3-2) || Henneman (17) || 40,046 || 26-33
|- align="center" bgcolor="ffbbbb"
| 60 || June 8 || @ Rangers || 2 – 0 || Oliver (5-2) || Guzmán (4-4) || || 43,439 || 26-34
|- align="center" bgcolor="ffbbbb"
| 61 || June 9 || @ Rangers || 8 – 6 || Witt (6-4) || Hanson (6-8) || Henneman (18) || 41,605 || 26-35
|- align="center" bgcolor="ffbbbb"
| 62 || June 10 || Yankees || 5 – 3 || Key (3-6) || Hentgen (6-5) || Wetteland (15) || 37,332 || 26-36
|- align="center" bgcolor="ffbbbb"
| 63 || June 11 || Yankees || 6 – 4 || Pettitte (10-3) || Quantrill (2-7) || Wetteland (16) || 32,114 || 26-37
|- align="center" bgcolor="bbffbb"
| 64 || June 12 || Yankees || 7 – 4 || Janzen (4-2) || Mendoza (1-2) || || 44,238 || 27-37
|- align="center" bgcolor="ffbbbb"
| 65 || June 13 || @ Angels || 6 – 4 || Finley (8-4) || Guzmán (4-5) || James (1) || 20,528 || 27-38
|- align="center" bgcolor="ffbbbb"
| 66 || June 14 || @ Angels || 7 – 4 || Grimsley (4-5) || Hanson (6-9) || Percival (17) || 18,503 || 27-39
|- align="center" bgcolor="ffbbbb"
| 67 || June 15 || @ Angels || 7 – 5 || Langston (4-2) || Crabtree (2-2) || Percival (18) || 40,352 || 27-40
|- align="center" bgcolor="bbffbb"
| 68 || June 16 || @ Angels || 6 – 4 || Quantrill (3-7) || Abbott (1-10) || Timlin (11) || 22,979 || 28-40
|- align="center" bgcolor="bbffbb"
| 69 || June 18 || @ Mariners || 11 – 3 || Guzmán (5-5) || Wolcott (5-7) || || 25,912 || 29-40
|- align="center" bgcolor="bbffbb"
| 70 || June 19 || @ Mariners || 9 – 2 || Hanson (7-9) || Harikkala (0-1) || || 26,265 || 30-40
|- align="center" bgcolor="bbffbb"
| 71 || June 20 || @ Athletics || 1 – 0 || Hentgen (7-5) || Wengert (2-5) || Timlin (12) || 8,027 || 31-40
|- align="center" bgcolor="bbffbb"
| 72 || June 21 || @ Athletics || 7 – 5 || Quantrill (4-7) || Johns (4-9) || Timlin (13) || 10,278 || 32-40
|- align="center" bgcolor="ffbbbb"
| 73 || June 22 || @ Athletics || 8 – 4 || Chouinard (1-2) || Ware (0-4) || || 20,124 || 32-41
|- align="center" bgcolor="bbffbb"
| 74 || June 23 || @ Athletics || 5 – 4 || Guzmán (6-5) || Wojciechowski (5-5) || Timlin (14) || 14,407 || 33-41
|- align="center" bgcolor="bbffbb"
| 75 || June 25 || Mariners || 8 – 7 || Crabtree (3-2) || Charlton (2-2) || || 31,420 || 34-41
|- align="center" bgcolor="bbffbb"
| 76 || June 26 || Mariners || 6 – 5 || Ware (1-4) || Ayala (0-1) || Crabtree (1) || 30,158 || 35-41
|- align="center" bgcolor="ffbbbb"
| 77 || June 27 || Mariners || 9 – 1 || Wells (9-1) || Quantrill (4-8) || || 31,108 || 35-42
|- align="center" bgcolor="ffbbbb"
| 78 || June 28 || Brewers || 5 – 1 || D'Amico (1-0) || Guzmán (6-6) || Fetters (13) || 31,333 || 35-43             
|- align="center" bgcolor="ffbbbb"
| 79 || June 29 || Brewers || 7 – 4 || Karl (8-3) || Janzen (4-3) || || 31,170 || 35-44
|- align="center" bgcolor="bbffbb"
| 80 || June 30 || Brewers || 15 – 2 || Hanson (8-9) || Bones (6-9) || || 30,104 || 36-44
|-

|- align="center" bgcolor="ffbbbb"
| 81 || July 1 || Orioles || 7 – 4 || Coppinger (3-0) || Hentgen (7-6) || Myers (16) || 43,377 || 36-45
|- align="center" bgcolor="ffbbbb"
| 82 || July 2 || Orioles || 8 – 2 || Erickson (5-6) || Quantrill (4-9) || || 32,150 || 36-46
|- align="center" bgcolor="bbffbb"
| 83 || July 3 || Orioles || 5 – 2 || Guzmán (7-6) || Krivda (2-4) || Timlin (15) || 32,365 || 37-46
|- align="center" bgcolor="ffbbbb"
| 84 || July 4 || @ Tigers || 6 – 1 || Nitkowski (1-0) || Janzen (4-4) || Myers (3) || 10,557 || 37-47
|- align="center" bgcolor="ffbbbb"
| 85 || July 5 || @ Tigers || 4 – 3 || Sager (1-1) || Hanson (8-10) || Olson (4) || 20,808 || 37-48
|- align="center" bgcolor="bbffbb"
| 86 || July 6 || @ Tigers || 15 – 0 || Hentgen (8-6) || Olivares (4-5) || || 16,228 || 38-48
|- align="center" bgcolor="ffbbbb"
| 87 || July 7 || @ Tigers || 9 – 0 || Lira (6-7) || Ware (1-5) || || 15,784 || 38-49
|- align="center" bgcolor="bbffbb"
| 88 || July 11 || @ Brewers || 6 – 3 || Guzmán (8-6) || D'Amico (1-2) || Castillo (1) || 16,019 || 39-49
|- align="center" bgcolor="ffbbbb"
| 89 || July 12 || @ Brewers || 12 – 5 || McDonald (10-3) || Hanson (8-11) || || 15,691 || 39-50
|- align="center" bgcolor="bbffbb"
| 90 || July 13 || @ Brewers || 15 – 7 || Hentgen (9-6) || Karl (8-5) || || 29,383 || 40-50
|- align="center" bgcolor="bbffbb"
| 91 || July 14 || @ Brewers || 7 – 5 (10)|| Crabtree (4-2) || García (3-3) || Timlin (16) || 20,798 || 41-50
|- align="center" bgcolor="ffbbbb"
| 92 || July 15 || @ Orioles || 8 – 6 || Haynes (3-5) || Timlin (0-2) || || 43,192 || 41-51
|- align="center" bgcolor="bbffbb"
| 93 || July 16 || @ Orioles || 6 – 0 || Guzmán (9-6) || Mussina (11-7) || || 45,851 || 42-51
|- align="center" bgcolor="ffbbbb"
| 94 || July 17 || @ Orioles || 11 – 10 || Coppinger (5-0) || Timlin (0-3) || || 45,955 || 42-52
|- align="center" bgcolor="bbffbb"
| 95 || July 18 || Tigers || 8 – 4 || Hentgen (10-6) || Nitkowski (1-2) || || 31,202 || 43-52
|- align="center" bgcolor="ffbbbb"
| 96 || July 19 || Tigers || 8 – 6 || Urbani (2-2) || Janzen (4-5) || Olson (6) || 30,123 || 43-53
|- align="center" bgcolor="ffbbbb"
| 97 || July 20 || Tigers || 5 – 4 (10)|| Olson (2-0) || Quantrill (4-10) || Lima (1) || 36,220 || 43-54
|- align="center" bgcolor="bbffbb"
| 98 || July 21 || Tigers || 5 – 4 (12)|| Spoljaric (1-0) || Lima (0-5) || || 33,238 || 44-54
|- align="center" bgcolor="ffbbbb"
| 99 || July 22 || Indians || 4 – 2 || Hershiser (10-6) || Hanson (8-12) || Mesa (25) || 35,517 || 44-55
|- align="center" bgcolor="bbffbb"
| 100 || July 23 || Indians || 3 – 1 || Hentgen (11-6) || Ogea (5-2) || Timlin (17) || 35,194 || 45-55
|- align="center" bgcolor="ffbbbb"
| 101 || July 24 || Indians || 10 – 0 || Martínez (9-5) || Janzen (4-6) || || 35,218 || 45-56
|- align="center" bgcolor="bbffbb"
| 102 || July 25 || Athletics || 4 – 3 || Crabtree (5-2) || Witasick (0-1) || || 30,174 || 46-56
|- align="center" bgcolor="ffbbbb"
| 103 || July 26 || Athletics || 5 – 3 || Groom (5-0) || Castillo (2-2) || Taylor (11) || 32,241 || 46-57
|- align="center" bgcolor="bbffbb"
| 104 || July 27 || Athletics || 6 – 4 || Hanson (9-12) || Wasdin (6-3) || Timlin (18) || 32,162 || 47-57
|- align="center" bgcolor="bbffbb"
| 105 || July 28 || Athletics || 1 – 0 || Hentgen (12-6) || Prieto (2-4) || || 31,150 || 48-57
|- align="center" bgcolor="bbffbb"
| 106 || July 30 || @ Indians || 3 – 1 || Flener (1-0) || Martínez (9-6) || Timlin (19) || 42,355 || 49-57
|- align="center" bgcolor="ffbbbb"
| 107 || July 31 || @ Indians || 4 – 2 || Assenmacher (2-1) || Timlin (0-4) || || 42,301 || 49-58
|-

|- align="center" bgcolor="bbffbb"
| 108 || August 1 || @ Indians || 5 – 3 || Hanson (10-12) || Lopez (1-3) || Timlin (20) || 42,249 || 50-58
|- align="center" bgcolor="bbffbb"
| 109 || August 2 || Angels || 9 – 2 || Hentgen (13-6) || Finley (11-9) || || 30,261 || 51-58
|- align="center" bgcolor="ffbbbb"
| 110 || August 3 || Angels || 11 – 6 || Langston (6-4) || Castillo (2-3) || || 32,139 || 51-59
|- align="center" bgcolor="bbffbb"
| 111 || August 4 || Angels || 7 – 1 || Flener (2-0) || Abbott (1-14) || || 30,253 || 52-59
|- align="center" bgcolor="ffbbbb"
| 112 || August 5 || @ Red Sox || 3 – 1 || Wakefield (9-10) || Guzmán (9-7) || || 23,884 || 52-60
|- align="center" bgcolor="ffbbbb"
| 113 || August 6 || @ Red Sox || 3 – 2 || Maddux (1-1) || Hanson (10-13) || Slocumb (16) || 25,264 || 52-61
|- align="center" bgcolor="ffbbbb"
| 114 || August 7 || @ Red Sox || 8 – 0 || Gordon (9-5) || Hentgen (13-7) || || 30,443 || 52-62
|- align="center" bgcolor="bbffbb"
| 115 || August 8 || @ Red Sox || 9 – 6 || Williams (1-0) || Sele (5-9) || Timlin (21) || 32,696 || 53-62
|- align="center" bgcolor="ffbbbb"
| 116 || August 9 || Rangers || 5 – 4 || Witt (11-8) || Quantrill (4-11) || Henneman (24) || 33,535 || 53-63
|- align="center" bgcolor="ffbbbb"
| 117 || August 10 || Rangers || 12 – 1 || Oliver (10-5) || Guzmán (9-8) || || 34,109 || 53-64
|- align="center" bgcolor="ffbbbb"
| 118 || August 11 || Rangers || 6 – 0 || Burkett (1-0) || Hanson (10-14) || || 32,162 || 53-65
|- align="center" bgcolor="bbffbb"
| 119 || August 12 || Red Sox || 5 – 1 || Hentgen (14-7) || Gordon (9-6) || || 33,250 || 54-65
|- align="center" bgcolor="ffbbbb"
| 120 || August 13 || Red Sox || 7 – 5 || Brandenburg (3-3) || Williams (1-1) || Slocumb (18) || 30,502 || 54-66
|- align="center" bgcolor="ffbbbb"
| 121 || August 14 || Red Sox || 8 – 6 || Belinda (2-1) || Crabtree (5-3) || Slocumb (19) || 32,354 || 54-67
|- align="center" bgcolor="ffbbbb"
| 122 || August 16 || @ Twins || 5 – 4 (10)|| Parra (4-3) || Quantrill (4-12) || || 19,838 || 54-68
|- align="center" bgcolor="ffbbbb"
| 123 || August 17 || @ Twins || 11 – 1 || Robertson (6-11) || Hanson (10-15) || || 20,354 || 54-69
|- align="center" bgcolor="bbffbb"
| 124 || August 18 || @ Twins || 6 – 2 || Hentgen (15-7) || Aguilera (6-5) || || 18,010 || 55-69
|- align="center" bgcolor="bbffbb"
| 125 || August 19 || @ Royals || 2 – 1 || Spoljaric (2-0) || Rosado (4-3) || Timlin (22) || 16,862 || 56-69
|- align="center" bgcolor="bbffbb"
| 126 || August 20 || @ Royals || 6 – 5 (14)|| Timlin (1-4) || Huisman (0-1) || || 14,568 || 57-69
|- align="center" bgcolor="bbffbb"
| 127 || August 21 || @ Royals || 6 – 2 || Guzmán (10-8) || Haney (9-12) || || 12,238 || 58-69
|- align="center" bgcolor="bbffbb"
| 128 || August 22 || @ White Sox || 1 – 0 (7) || Hanson (11-15) || Fernandez (12-8) || || 22,394 || 59-69
|- align="center" bgcolor="bbffbb"
| 129 || August 23 || @ White Sox || 4 – 2 || Hentgen (16-7) || Ruffcorn (0-1) || || 19,132 || 60-69
|- align="center" bgcolor="bbffbb"
| 130 || August 24 || @ White Sox || 9 – 2 || Williams (2-1) || Baldwin (9-4) || || 29,413 || 61-69
|- align="center" bgcolor="ffbbbb"
| 131 || August 25 || @ White Sox || 10 – 9 (10)|| Hernández (5-1) || Timlin (1-5) || || 19,647 || 61-70
|- align="center" bgcolor="bbffbb"
| 132 || August 26 || Twins || 5 – 3 || Guzmán (11-8) || Radke (8-14) || Timlin (23) || 31,134 || 62-70
|- align="center" bgcolor="ffbbbb"
| 133 || August 27 || Twins || 6 – 4 (11)|| Trombley (4-1) || Quantrill (4-13) || || 30,033 || 62-71
|- align="center" bgcolor="bbffbb"
| 134 || August 28 || Twins || 6 – 1 || Hentgen (17-7) || Aguilera (7-6) || || 30,106 || 63-71
|- align="center" bgcolor="ffbbbb"
| 135 || August 30 || White Sox || 11 – 2 || Tapani (12-8) || Williams (2-2) || || 30,072 || 63-72
|- align="center" bgcolor="ffbbbb"
| 136 || August 31 || White Sox || 5 – 1 || Álvarez (15-7) || Flener (2-1) || || 32,141 || 63-73
|-

|- align="center" bgcolor="ffbbbb"
| 137 || September 1 || White Sox || 4 – 2 (11)|| Hernández (6-1) || Spoljaric (2-1) || || 30,156 || 63-74
|- align="center" bgcolor="ffbbbb"
| 138 || September 2 || Royals || 2 – 0 || Belcher (13-8) || Hanson (11-16) || || 28,177 || 63-75
|- align="center" bgcolor="ffbbbb"
| 139 || September 3 || Royals || 5 – 2 || Appier (12-10) || Hentgen (17-8) || || 25,729 || 63-76
|- align="center" bgcolor="bbffbb"
| 140 || September 4 || Royals || 6 – 0 || Williams (3-2) || Rosado (5-5) || || 25,827 || 64-76
|- align="center" bgcolor="ffbbbb"
| 141 || September 6 || @ Yankees || 4 – 3 || Rivera (5-2) || Risley (0-1) || || 21,528 || 64-77
|- align="center" bgcolor="bbffbb"
| 142 || September 7 || @ Yankees || 3 – 2 || Quantrill (5-13) || Cone (5-2) || Timlin (24) || 27,069 || 65-77
|- align="center" bgcolor="bbffbb"
| 143 || September 8 || @ Yankees || 4 – 2 || Hanson (12-16) || Pettitte (20-8) || Timlin (25) || 28,575 || 66-77
|- align="center" bgcolor="ffbbbb"
| 144 || September 9 || Rangers || 4 – 3 || Gross (11-8) || Hentgen (17-9) || Henneman (29) || 25,825 || 66-78
|- align="center" bgcolor="ffbbbb"
| 145 || September 10 || Rangers || 11 – 8 || Oliver (12-6) || Williams (3-3) || Henneman (30) || 26,286 || 66-79
|- align="center" bgcolor="bbffbb"
| 146 || September 11 || Rangers || 8 – 3 || Andújar (1-2) || Vosberg (1-1) || || 27,262 || 67-79
|- align="center" bgcolor="ffbbbb"
| 147 || September 13 || Yankees || 4 – 1 || Pettitte (21-8) || Hanson (12-17) || Wetteland (40) || 31,227 || 67-80
|- align="center" bgcolor="ffbbbb"
| 148 || September 14 || Yankees || 3 – 1 || Boehringer (2-3) || Hentgen (17-10) || Wetteland (41) || 43,397 || 67-81
|- align="center" bgcolor="bbffbb"
| 149 || September 15 || Yankees || 3 – 1 || Williams (4-3) || Mendoza (3-5) || Timlin (26) || 36,268 || 68-81
|- align="center" bgcolor="ffbbbb"
| 150 || September 16 || Yankees || 10 – 0 || Key (12-10) || Quantrill (5-14) || || 30,115 || 68-82
|- align="center" bgcolor="ffbbbb"
| 151 || September 17 || @ Brewers || 4 – 0 || McDonald (12-10) || Andújar (1-3) || || 10,184 || 68-83
|- align="center" bgcolor="ffbbbb"
| 152 || September 18 || @ Brewers || 2 – 1 || Fetters (3-2) || Timlin (1-6) || || 9,550 || 68-84
|- align="center" bgcolor="bbffbb"
| 153 || September 20 || @ Orioles || 5 – 1 || Hentgen (18-10) || Krivda (2-5) || Spoljaric (1) || 47,026 || 69-84
|- align="center" bgcolor="ffbbbb"
| 154 || September 21 || @ Orioles || 6 – 3 || Coppinger (9-6) || Williams (4-4) || Myers (31) || 47,270 || 69-85
|- align="center" bgcolor="ffbbbb"
| 155 || September 22 || @ Orioles || 5 – 4 || Erickson (13-11) || Flener (2-2) || Benítez (2) || 46,035 || 69-86
|- align="center" bgcolor="bbffbb"
| 156 || September 23 || @ Tigers || 6 – 4 || Hanson (13-17) || Sager (4-5) || Timlin (27) || 9,678 || 70-86
|- align="center" bgcolor="bbffbb"
| 157 || September 24 || @ Tigers || 4 – 1 || Hentgen (19-10) || Miller (0-4) || Timlin (28) || 8,355 || 71-86
|- align="center" bgcolor="bbffbb"
| 158 || September 25 || @ Tigers || 13 – 11 || Brow (1-0) || Cummings (3-2) || Timlin (29) || 8,055 || 72-86
|- align="center" bgcolor="ffbbbb"
| 159 || September 26 || Orioles || 4 – 1 || Coppinger (10-6) || Williams (4-5) || Benítez (4) || 30,141 || 72-87
|- align="center" bgcolor="bbffbb"
| 160 || September 27 || Orioles || 3 – 2 || Flener (3-2) || Erickson (13-12) || Timlin (30) || 30,116 || 73-87
|- align="center" bgcolor="ffbbbb"
| 161 || September 28 || Orioles || 3 – 2 (10)|| Myers (4-4) || Spoljaric (2-2) || || 36,316 || 73-88
|- align="center" bgcolor="bbffbb"
| 162 || September 29 || Orioles || 4 – 1 || Hentgen (20-10) || Rodríguez (0-1) || Timlin (31) || 38,267 || 74-88
|-

|

Player stats

Batting

Starters by position
Note: Pos = Position; G = Games played; AB = At bats; H = Hits; Avg. = Batting average; HR = Home runs; RBI = Runs batted in; SB = Stolen bases

Other batters
Note: G = Games played; AB = At bats; H = Hits; Avg. = Batting average; HR = Home runs; RBI = Runs batted in

Pitching

Starting pitchers
Note: G = Games pitched; IP = Innings pitched; W = Wins; L = Losses; ERA = Earned run average; SO = Strikeouts

Other pitchers
Note: G = Games pitched; IP = Innings pitched; W = Wins; L = Losses; ERA = Earned run average; SO = Strikeouts

Relief pitchers
Note: G = Games pitched; W = Wins; L = Losses; SV = Saves; ERA = Earned run average; SO = Strikeouts

Award winners
Juan Guzmán, Pitcher of the Month Award, April
Juan Guzmán, American League ERA Leader, 2.93
Pat Hentgen, Pitcher of the Month Award, July
Pat Hentgen, Pitcher of the Month Award, August
 Pat Hentgen, Cy Young Award

All-Star Game
Joe Carter, OF
Joe Carter received boos at the All-Star Game, as it took place at Veterans Stadium, the home of the Philadelphia Phillies, for his home run that ended the 1993 World Series.

Farm system

References

External links
1996 Toronto Blue Jays at Baseball Reference
1996 Toronto Blue Jays at Baseball Almanac

Toronto Blue Jays seasons
Toronto Blue Jays season
1996 in Canadian sports
1996 in Toronto